Aleksandr Yevgenyevich Karatayev (born 22 November 1973) is a Russian professional football coach and a former player. In 2009, he managed an Amateur Football League side FC MITOS Novocherkassk. He made his professional debut in the Soviet First League in 1990 for FC Rostselmash Rostov-on-Don.

He played one game for FC Bayern Munich Amateure in the DFB-Pokal and some league matches for this team.

Honours
 Soviet Top League runner-up: 1991
 Russian Premier League champion: 1992
 Soviet Cup winner: 1992

References

1973 births
Living people
Soviet footballers
Russian footballers
Russia youth international footballers
FC Rostov players
FC Spartak Moscow players
FC Bayern Munich footballers
FC Bayern Munich II players
FC KAMAZ Naberezhnye Chelny players
1. FSV Mainz 05 players
FC Khimki players
FC SKA Rostov-on-Don players
Soviet Top League players
Russian Premier League players
2. Bundesliga players
Russian football managers
Russian expatriate footballers
Expatriate footballers in Germany
FC Nika Krasny Sulin players
Association football midfielders
FC Neftekhimik Nizhnekamsk players
FC Lokomotiv Moscow players
FC Amur Blagoveshchensk players
Sportspeople from Taganrog